Jack Adair Tobin, Ph.D. (June 15, 1920 – June 18, 2010) was an American anthropologist who devoted much of his life to the people of the Republic of the Marshall Islands.

Tobin served in the United States Navy during World War II and was a survivor of the Attack on Pearl Harbor on December 7, 1941. He enrolled at the University of Hawaii following the end of World War II, earning a bachelor's degree in anthropology. He studied under Dr. Leonard Mason, a leading specialist on Micronesia, who instilled Tobin's interest in the Marshall Islands.

In the early 1950s, Tobin attended a research trip to Arno Atoll. He became a district anthropologist for the Marshall Islands, then part of the Trust Territory of the Pacific Islands, shortly after the Arno research trip. He left the Marshalls and completed his doctorate in anthropology from the University of California, Berkeley. He returned to the Marshall Islands, where he worked as a community development officer.

Tobin moved to Honolulu, Hawaii, upon his retirement. In 2002, he released his best known book, Stories from the Marshall Islands. This book is a collection of stories gathered by District Anthropologist Jack A. Tobin who was assigned as district anthropologist for the Marshall Islands District during the US Administrative tenure of the UN mandated Micronesian Strategic Trust Territory. It is a collection of stories from local experts with background information on each storyteller. Anthropologist Tobin walks us into the life of Marshallese historians in the form of actual people as they reflected the written word of an orally defined culture where oral tradition triumphs in relaying epistemology. Anthropologist Tobin provides stories about beginnings, stories about animals, stories about evil spirits and flying women, and stories of historical events. In Stories from the Marshall Islands, Tobin seeks to reminds us that oral history is worth preserving and thus serves a solid basis as a method of understanding that is shared in both indigenous and western academic settings. Tobin comes to the conclusion that the belief structures of pre-contact Marshallese and that of other indigenous pacific societies are strikingly similar.
This book is useful in attaining a more accurate description of the cultural scenario in the Marshall Islands. It is useful in detailing the cultural and social structure given the authors credible nature. It serves as a primary source because it literally represents a comprehensive account of Tobin's fieldwork with indigenous Marshallese all while working under the American bureaucracy. When used with other primary source documents collected by Tobin such as genealogies, this book is useful in identifying key figures important in Marshallese society that evidently constructed it and are important in the historical conversations detailing its very existence. A key strength in Tobin's research is that it is largely primary and this entire book is a collection of his field research. He compares Christian beliefs and other Oceanic beliefs to Marshallese cosmologies to indicate a common belief structure. Ironically, this is how Marshallese view themselves to be today in the modern context. They know themselves to be human and thus preserve the traits that make them appear, in its most accurate depiction of themselves, to be deserving human beings of similar qualities to their fellow man. Tobin has skillfully crafted a work where indigenous Marshallese are able to exist as fellow humans within the world of academia and society by showcasing primary examples of similarities across geographical distinctions. Tobin basically confirms that people from all over are similarly situated when it comes to how they construct their universe and in many ways are misjudged to be thought of as less even if they are the same story and represent equally valid pieces of history that construct humanity's clock. He has perfectly captured that reality through the Marshallese indigenous lens by sharing this collection of stories with additional etymological commentaries. This book reflects his own research gatherings as a practicing anthropologist and greatly serves in aiding understanding of Marshallese knowledge systems. Tobin's extensive research and commitment to the Marshall Islands has given much needed relevance to the Marshall Islands in today's world of academia where it is now registered as intellectual capital in an American University where the Center of Pacific Studies is situated in the University of Hawaii. http://digicoll.manoa.hawaii.edu/tobin/

Jack Tobin died in Honolulu on June 18, 2010.

References

1920 births
2010 deaths
American anthropologists
University of Hawaiʻi alumni
UC Berkeley College of Letters and Science alumni
United States Navy personnel of World War II
People from Honolulu
American expatriates in the Marshall Islands